The Beautiful Adventure is a 1932 German French-language romantic comedy film directed by Roger Le Bon and Reinhold Schünzel and starring Jean Périer, Paule Andral and Daniel Lecourtois. It is a French-language version of the German film The Beautiful Adventure. As was common at the time, the two films were shot in completely different versions with major changes to the cast and some scenes.

Plot
On her wedding day, a young bride takes off with her cousin, who she has always loved.

Cast

See also
The Beautiful Adventure (1917)
The Beautiful Adventure (1942)

References

Bibliography

External links 
 

1932 films
German romantic comedy films
1932 romantic comedy films
1930s French-language films
Films directed by Roger Le Bon
UFA GmbH films
French multilingual films
French films based on plays
German black-and-white films
German multilingual films
1932 multilingual films
1930s German films